Giacomo Altoè (born 5 October 2000) is an Italian Lamborghini racing driver. Having previously competed in the Italian F4 Championship and TCR Middle East Series amongst others.

Racing career
Altoè began his career in 2015 in Karting. In 2016 he switched to the Italian F4 Championship making his circuit racing debut, during the season he took six points finishes, on his way to finishing twenty-second in the standings. He switched to the TCR Middle East Series for 2017, starting the season at the second round with Top Run Motorsport, before switching to Liqui Moly Team Engstler for the last round. He finished the season fifth in the standings, taking two podiums.

In March 2017 it was announced that he would race in the TCR International Series, driving a Volkswagen Golf GTI TCR for WestCoast Racing. But he switched to M1RA for the round in Buriram - that was his final weekend of the year in the international field.

Racing record

Career summary

Complete TCR International Series results
(key) (Races in bold indicate pole position) (Races in italics indicate fastest lap)

Complete WeatherTech SportsCar Championship results
(key) (Races in bold indicate pole position; results in italics indicate fastest lap)

References

External links
 

2000 births
Living people
TCR International Series drivers
Italian racing drivers
Italian F4 Championship drivers
24 Hours of Daytona drivers
24H Series drivers
GT World Challenge America drivers
Blancpain Endurance Series drivers
WeatherTech SportsCar Championship drivers
International GT Open drivers
Euronova Racing drivers
Emil Frey Racing drivers
Bhaitech drivers
Target Racing drivers
Nürburgring 24 Hours drivers
Lamborghini Squadra Corse drivers
TCR Europe Touring Car Series drivers